Mohamed Ali El-Dahan (born 14 July 1960) is a Syrian boxer. He competed at the 1980 Summer Olympics and the 1984 Summer Olympics.

Olympic results 
1980 (Welterweight)
Lost to Karl-Heinz Krüger (East Germany) 0-5
1984 (Welterweight)
Lost to Alexander Künzler (West Germany) 0-5
17th place

References

1960 births
Living people
Syrian male boxers
Olympic boxers of Syria
Boxers at the 1980 Summer Olympics
Boxers at the 1984 Summer Olympics
Place of birth missing (living people)
Welterweight boxers
20th-century Syrian people